Paduka Sri Sultan Dziaddin Mukarram Shah II ibni al-Marhum Sultan Muhammad Jiwa Zainal Adilin Mu'adzam Shah II (died 25 January 1815; also spelt Sultan Ziyauddin Mukarram Shah II or Sultan Dhiauddin Mukarram Shah II) was the 21st Sultan of Kedah. His reign was from 1797 to 1803. He was appointed as second heir to his brother Abdullah Mukarram Shah and invested with the title of Raja Muda on 6 April 1760. He was appointed as Heir Presumptive and invested with the title of Sultan and Yang di-Pertuan Muda of Perlis and Kedah, with the style of Duli Yang Maha Mulia, and granted Perlis, Kubang Pasu, Setul and Langu in fief, 1770. He succeeded on the death of his elder half-brother, 1 September 1797. He ceded Seberang Perai (Province Wellesley) to the Honourable East India Company (HEIC) in return for an annual stipend on 7 July 1800. He concluded a treaty of friendship and alliance with the HEIC on 6 June 1800. He eventually was forced by the King of Siam to abdicate in favour of his nephew and made ruler of the province of Perlis (Kayangan) with the title of Raja Muda Kayang on September 1803.

External links
 List of Sultans of Kedah

1815 deaths
18th-century Sultans of Kedah
19th-century Sultans of Kedah